Visitors to Vanuatu must obtain a visa unless they travel on a passport from one of the visa exempt countries. All visitors must hold a passport valid for at least 6 months from the date of arrival.

Vanuatu signed a mutual visa-waiver agreement with the European Union on 28 May 2015 which was ratified on 15 December 2015. This agreement allows all citizens of states that are contracting parties to the Schengen Agreement to stay without a visa for a maximum period of 90 days in any 180-day period.

Visa policy map

Visa exemption

90 days
Holders of passports of the following 32 jurisdictions do not require a visa to visit Vanuatu for up to 90 days within any 180 day period:

30 days
Holders of passports of the following 89 jurisdictions do not require a visa to visit Vanuatu for up to 30 days:

Statistics

Most visitors arriving to Vanuatu were from the following countries:

See also

Visa requirements for Vanuatuan citizens

References

External links
Countries requiring a visitor visa to enter Vanuatu

Foreign relations of Vanuatu
Vanuatu